The 1994 Georgia Tech Yellow Jackets football team represented the Georgia Institute of Technology in the 1994 NCAA Division I-A football season. The Yellow Jackets were led by head coach Bill Lewis through eight games, being fired after going 1–7. Defensive coordinator George O'Leary replaced Lewis as interim head coach for the remaining three games of the season. Georgia Tech played its home games at Bobby Dodd Stadium in Atlanta.

Schedule

Roster

References

Georgia Tech
Georgia Tech Yellow Jackets football seasons
Georgia Tech Yellow Jackets football